Emanuela Rossi (born January 24, 1959) is an Italian actress.

Biography
Rossi has been active as an actress and dubbing artist since the early 1970s and she has starred in over eight films since 1989. She also made television, stage and dubbing collaborations with her husband Francesco Pannofino. Rossi is the official Italian voice of Michelle Pfeiffer and Emma Thompson. She has also dubbed Robin Wright, Rene Russo, Kim Basinger, Olivia Newton-John, Debra Winger, Cate Blanchett and Sissy Spacek in some of their works.

Rossi is best known for providing the Italian voices of Trinity in The Matrix, Mary Alice Young in Desperate Housewives, Demona in Gargoyles and she dubbed at least two characters in the soap opera The Young and the Restless.

Personal life
Rossi is the sister of voice actors Massimo and Riccardo Rossi and the cousin of voice actors Laura and Fabio Boccanera. Rossi is also married to actor and voice actor Francesco Pannofino. Together, they have one son, Andrea. They briefly divorced in 2006 but they eventually remarried in 2011.

Filmography

Cinema
Le finte bionde (1989)
Physical Jerks (1997)
E adesso sesso (2001)
Innamorata della morte (2005)
Seven Kilometers from Jerusalem (2007)
Una notte da paura (2012) - TV Film
Operazione vacanze (2012)
Mio papà (2014)

References

External links

1959 births
Living people
Actresses from Rome
Italian voice actresses
Italian stage actresses
Italian film actresses
Italian television actresses
Italian voice directors